Nordtrafikk is a Norwegian truck and ambulance operator based in Sortland. The company operates ambulance services for Northern Norway Regional Health Authority. The company's bus (Nordtrafikk Buss AS) and ferry (Nordtrafikk Maritim AS) operations were sold to Veolia Transport Norge in 2006. They formerly operated bus routes in Harstad (including the airport bus to Harstad/Narvik Airport, Evenes), Lofoten, Salten, Trysil and Vesterålen and ferry transport in Lofoten and Vesterålen.

Nordtrafikk was founded in 1936 with the name A/L Langøya Biltrafikk, later changed to Vesterålens Trafikklag AS and in 1988 to its present name. Since 1990 it has bought a number of companies, including Boldevins Bilruter (1990), Harstad Oppland Rutebil (1996), Nordland Ambulanse (1997), Lofoten Trafikklag (1999), Trysilbussen (2000) and Ambunor (2001).

Management
Ole Lund Riber was CEO from 1987 until 2007, when the position was taken over by Terje Steiro. Before ´87, Ole Lund Riber ran Nordtrafikk's forerunner Vesterålen Trafikklag.

Ambulance services in Norway
Bus companies of Innlandet
Bus companies of Nordland
Bus companies of Troms og Finnmark
Companies based in Nordland
Ferry companies of Nordland
Ferry companies of Troms og Finnmark
Shipping companies of Norway
Transport companies established in 1936
1936 establishments in Norway